Patrick White (1912–1990) was a Nobel Prize–winning Australian author.

Patrick or Pat White may refer to:

Politicians
Patrick White (judge) (c.1480–1561), Irish politician and judge
Patrick White (politician) (1860–1935), Irish Member of Parliament for North Meath, 1900–1918

Sportspeople
Pat White (rugby league), New Zealand footballer during 1950s and 1960s
Pat White (gridiron football) (born 1986), American professional baseball and football player
Patrick White (ice hockey) (born 1989), American ice hockey player

Writers
Pat White (before 1900—after 1937), American songwriter ("It's the Same Old Shillelagh", "I'm Leaving Tipperary")
Patrick Franklin White (born 1981), Canadian journalist and author

Others
Patrick H. White (1832–1915), American Civil War Medal of Honor recipient
Patrick White (bishop) (born 1942), Canadian Bishop of Bermuda

See also
Patricia White (disambiguation)
Paddy Whyte (1894–1977), Australian politician in Queensland